Songs for My Mother is the fifth studio album released by Boyzone frontman and Irish singer/songwriter Ronan Keating. The album was released on 16 March 2009 on Polydor Records, and is his first album to be released since the reunion of Boyzone.

The album was a commercial success, debuting at #4 on the Irish Albums Chart before peaking at #1 on its second week of release. It also peaked at #1 in Australia and the United Kingdom. In New Zealand, the album debuted at number sixteen, jumping to number one the following week. The album spent three weeks at number one and was certified Platinum, selling over 15,000 copies.

Album information
The album was recorded over the span of two days during Christmas 2008 at British Grove Studios. The album was recorded with his usual backing band and a live orchestra. Ronan took time out of his busy Boyzone schedule in order to record the album. The album is produced by Stephen Lipson. The album was recorded in memory of his late mother Marie Keating and also to celebrate Mother's Day. The songs that Ronan chose to record for the album are songs that he remembers his mother listening to throughout his childhood. This album also contains a new version of his own song "This Is Your Song", a track which he wrote that originally appeared as the B-Side to his very first single, "When You Say Nothing at All", and his third studio album, Turn It On.

Track listing

Chart performance
Due to the album's release being so close to Mother's Day in the United Kingdom, the album peaked at No. 1 on the UK Albums Chart. It debuted at No. 4 on the Irish Albums Chart, before peaking at No. 1 in its second week of release. It peaked at No. 1 in Australia, while in New Zealand, the album debuted at number sixteen, jumping to number one the following week. The album spent three weeks at number one and was certified Platinum, selling over 15,000 copies.

Certifications

References

2009 albums
Ronan Keating albums
Albums produced by Stephen Lipson
Polydor Records albums